Hakan Bilgiç (born 30 October 1992) is a Turkish professional footballer who plays as a defender for Boluspor.

Professional career
Hakan was born in Turkey and moved to Belgium at the age of 6. He began his footballing career as a youth with the Belgian club Brussels FC. After a couple successful seasons with Elazığspor in the TFF First League, Hakan moved to Sivasspor. Hakan made his professional debut for Sivasspor in a 1–0 Süper Lig loss to Akhisar Belediyespor on 12 August 2017.

References

External links
 
 
 
 Sivasspor Profile

1992 births
People from Midyat
Belgian people of Turkish descent
Living people
Turkish footballers
Belgian footballers
Association football defenders
R.W.D.M. Brussels F.C. players
Elazığspor footballers
Sivasspor footballers
Adana Demirspor footballers
Bandırmaspor footballers
Boluspor footballers
Challenger Pro League players
TFF First League players
Süper Lig players
TFF Second League players